The 1836–37 United States House of Representatives elections were held on various dates in various states between July 4, 1836 and November 7, 1837. Each state set its own date for its elections to the House of Representatives, either before or after the first session of the 25th United States Congress convened on September 4, 1837. With Arkansas and Michigan officially achieving statehood in 1836 and 1837, respectively, the size of the House was set at 242 seats. 

Though Democrat Martin Van Buren was elected president in November 1836, Democrats lost seats.  The newly organizing Whigs benefited from regional candidacies and issues and voter fatigue with outgoing two-term President Andrew Jackson.  Jackson, a flamboyant public personality with a record of high-profile leadership and historic military success, often clashed with Congress and the Supreme Court.  By comparison, Van Buren, a brilliant partisan organizer and political operative, was less charismatic in looks and demeanor.  Voter support for the minor Anti-Masonic and Nullifier parties ebbed, but remained significant. One Independent, John Pope, was elected from Kentucky.

Election summaries

Special elections 

There were special elections in 1836 and 1837 to the 24th United States Congress and 25th United States Congress.

Special elections are sorted by date then district.

24th Congress 
Note: In some sources, parties are listed as "Democrats" and "Whigs."  However, they are listed here as "Jacksonian" and "Anti-Jacksonian" (respectively) to conform to the party names as they were regarded during the 24th United States Congress.

|-
! 
| Zalmon Wildman
|  | Jacksonian
| 1835
|  | Incumbent died December 10, 1835.New member elected in early 1836.Jacksonian hold.Successor seated April 29, 1836.Successor also later elected to the next term, see below.
| nowrap | 

|-
! 
| Andrew T. Judson
|  | Jacksonian
| 1835
|  | Incumbent resigned July 4, 1836, to become judge of the United States District Court for the District of Connecticut.New member elected in mid-to-late 1836.Jacksonian hold.Successor seated December 5, 1836.Successor also later elected to the next term, see below.
| nowrap | 

|-
! 
| James Graham
|  | Jacksonian
| 1833
|  | Seat declared vacant March 29, 1836.Incumbent re-elected August 4, 1836.Anti-Jacksonian gain.Incumbent seated December 5, 1836.Incumbent also later elected to the next term, see below.
| nowrap | 

|-
! 
| James H. Hammond
|  | Nullifier
| 1834
|  | Incumbent resigned February 26, 1836, because of ill-health.New member elected October 10, 1836.Nullifier hold.Successor seated December 19, 1836.Successor also elected the same day to the next term, see below.
| nowrap | 

|-
! 
| John Banks 
|  | Anti-Masonic
| 1830
|  | Incumbent resigned March 31, 1836.New member elected October 11, 1836.Anti-Jacksonian gain.Successor seated December 5, 1836.Successor was not a candidate the same day for the next term, see below.
| nowrap | 

|-
! 
| Richard I. Manning
|  | Jacksonian
| 1834 
|  | Incumbent died May 1, 1836.New member elected October 11, 1836.Jacksonian hold.Successor seated December 19, 1836.Successor elected the same day for the next term, see below.
| nowrap | 

|-
! 
| John E. Coffee
|  | Jacksonian
| 1832
|  | Incumbent died September 25, 1836.New member elected October 30, 1836.Nullifier gain.Successor seated December 26, 1836.Successor had already been elected to the next term, see below.
| nowrap | 

|-
! 
| Jesse Miller
|  | Jacksonian
| 1832
|  | Incumbent resigned October 30, 1836.New member elected November 4, 1836.Jacksonian hold.Successor seated December 5, 1836.Successor had not been a candidate for the next term, see below.
| nowrap | 

|-
! 
| David Dickson
|  | Jacksonian
| 1835
|  | Incumbent died July 31, 1836.New member elected November 7, 1836.Jacksonian hold.Successor seated January 7, 1837.Successor was not later elected to the next term, see below.
| nowrap | 

|-
! 
| Samuel Beardsley
|  | Jacksonian
| 1830
|  | Incumbent resigned March 29, 1836.New member elected November 7–9, 1836.Jacksonian hold.Successor seated December 5, 1836.Successor was not a candidate the same day for the next term, see below.
| nowrap | 

|-
! 
| Philo C. Fuller
|  | Jacksonian
| 1832
|  | Incumbent resigned September 2, 1836.New member elected November 9, 1836.Anti-Jacksonian gain.Successor seated December 6, 1836.Successor was not a candidate the same day for the next term, see below.
| nowrap | 

|-
! 
| Philemon Dickerson
|  | Jacksonian
| 1832
|  | Incumbent resigned November 3, 1836, to become Governor of New Jersey.New member elected November 15–16, 1836.Anti-Jacksonian gain.Successor seated December 5, 1836.Successor was not a candidate the same day for the next term, see below.
| nowrap | 

|-
! 
| George W. Towns
|  | Jacksonian
| 1834
|  | Incumbent resigned September 1, 1836.New member elected January 2, 1837.Anti-Jacksonian gain.Successor seated January 31, 1837.Successor had already lost election to the next term, see below.
| nowrap | 

|-
! 
| George L. Kinnard
|  | Jacksonian
| 1833
|  | Incumbent died November 26, 1836.New member elected January 2, 1837.Anti-Jacksonian gain.Successor seated January 25, 1837.Successor also later elected to the next term, see below.
| nowrap | 

|}

25th Congress 

|-
! 
| Francis J. Harper
|  | Democratic
| 1836
|  | Incumbent died March 18, 1837, having just been seated as a new member.New member elected June 29, 1837.Whig gain.Successor seated September 4, 1837.
| nowrap | 

|-
! rowspan=2 | 
| John F. H. Claiborne
|  | Democratic
| 1835
| rowspan=2  | Mississippi elected its members in November of odd numbered years (after the beginning of the congressional term). As Congress had been called to meet in September, the governor issued writs for a special election to fill vacancies until the regular election.Incumbents re-elected July 18, 1837.Democratic hold.Incumbent successors presented their credentials and were seated September 4, 1837.At their request the question of the validity of their election was referred to the Committee on Elections. The House decided October 3, 1837, they had been elected for the full term.
| rowspan=2 nowrap | 

|-
| Samuel J. Gholson
|  | Democratic
| 1836 

|-
! 
| James I. Standifer
|  | Whig
| 18231825 1827 1829
|  | Incumbent died August 20, 1837.New member elected September 14, 1837.Whig hold.Successor seated October 6, 1837.
| nowrap | 

|-
! 
| Andrew W. Loomis
|  | Whig
| 1836
|  | Incumbent resigned October 20, 1837.New member elected November 30, 1837.Whig hold.Successor seated December 20, 1837.
| nowrap | 

|}

Alabama 

|-
! 

|-
! 

|-
! 

|-
! 

|-
! 

|}

Arkansas

24th Congress 

The new state of Arkansas was admitted to the Union on June 15, 1836, and elected its sole at-large member August 1, 1836.  He was seated December 5, 1836, to finish the term that would end the following March.

|-
! 
| colspan=3 | New seat
|  | New member elected.Jacksonian gain.Same member also later elected to the next term, see below.
| nowrap | 

|}

25th Congress 

Arkansas elected its member October 2, 1837, this time for a full term.

|-
! 
| Archibald Yell
| 1836
|  | Jacksonian
| Incumbent re-elected.
| nowrap | 

|}

Connecticut 

Connecticut went from six at-large seats to six districts for the first time. Elections were held April 3, 1837, after the new term began but before the Congress convened.

|-
! 

|-
! 

|-
! 

|-
! 

|-
! 

|-
! 

|}

Delaware 

|-
! 

|}

Florida Territory 
See Non-voting delegates, below.

Georgia 

|-
! rowspan=9 | 
| 
| 
| 
| 
| rowspan=9 | 

|-
|
|-
|
|-
|
|-
|
|-
|
|-
|
|-
|
|-
|
|}

Illinois 

Illinois elected its three members on August 1, 1834.

|-
! 
| John Reynolds
|  | Jacksonian
| 1834
|  | Incumbent lost re-election as a Democrat.New member elected.Democratic gain.
| nowrap | 

|-
! 
| Zadok Casey
|  | Jacksonian
| 1832
|  | Incumbent re-elected to a new party.Democratic gain.
| nowrap | 

|-
! 
| William L. May
|  | Jacksonian
| 1834
|  | Incumbent re-elected to a new party.Democratic gain.
| nowrap | 

|}

Indiana 

|-
! 

|-
! 

|-
! 

|-
! 

|-
! 

|-
! 

|-
! 

|}

Kentucky 

|-
! 

|-
! 

|-
! 

|-
! 

|-
! 

|-
! 

|-
! 

|-
! 

|-
! 

|-
! 

|-
! 

|-
! 

|-
! 

|}

Louisiana 

|-
! 

|-
! 

|-
! 

|}

Maine 

Maine elected its members September 12, 1836, except one district went to multiple ballots later in the year.

|-
! 

|-
! 

|-
! 

|-
! 

|-
! 

|-
! 

|-
! 

|-
! 
| Gorham Parks
|  | Democratic 
| 1833
|  | Unknown if incumbent retired or lost renomination.New member elected after two ballots.Democratic hold.
| nowrap | 
|}

Maryland 

|-
! 

|-
! 

|-
! 

|-
! rowspan=2 | 
|
|-
|
|-
! 

|-
! 

|-
! 

|-
! 

|}

Massachusetts 

Elections were held November 14, 1836.

|-
! 
| Abbott Lawrence
|  | Anti-Jacksonian
| 1834
|  | Incumbent retired.New member elected.Whig gain.
| nowrap | 

|-
! 
| Stephen C. Phillips
|  | Anti-Jacksonian
| 1834 
|  | Incumbent re-elected from a different party.Whig gain.
| nowrap | 

|-
! 
| Caleb Cushing
|  | Anti-Jacksonian
| 1834
|  | Incumbent re-elected from a different party.Whig gain.
| nowrap | 

|-
! 
| Samuel Hoar
|  | Anti-Jacksonian
| 1834
|  | Incumbent lost re-election from a different party.New member elected.Democratic gain.
| nowrap | 

|-
! 
| Levi Lincoln Jr.
|  | Anti-Jacksonian
| 1834 
|  | Incumbent re-elected from a different party.Whig gain.
| nowrap | 

|-
! 
| George Grennell Jr.
|  | Anti-Jacksonian
| 1834
|  | Incumbent re-elected from a different party.Whig gain.
| nowrap | 

|-
! 
| George N. Briggs
|  | Anti-Jacksonian
| 1830
|  | Incumbent re-elected from a different party.Whig gain.
| nowrap | 

|-
! 
| William B. Calhoun
|  | Anti-Jacksonian
| 1834
|  | Incumbent re-elected from a different party.Whig gain.
| nowrap | 

|-
! 
| William S. Hastings
|  | Anti-Jacksonian
| 1836
|  | Incumbent re-elected from a different party.Whig gain.
| nowrap | 

|-
! 
| Nathaniel B. Borden
|  | Jacksonian
| 1835
|  | Incumbent re-elected from a new party.Democratic gain.
| nowrap | 

|-
! 
| John Reed Jr.
|  | Anti-Masonic
| 18121816 1818
|  | Incumbent re-elected from a different party.Whig gain.
| nowrap | 

|-
! 
| John Quincy Adams
|  | Anti-Masonic
| 1830
|  | Incumbent re-elected from a different party.Whig gain.
| nowrap | 

|}

Michigan 

Michigan elected its sole member late on August 22, 1837.

|-
! 
| Isaac E. Crary
|  | Jacksonian
| 1835
|  | Incumbent re-elected to a new party.Democratic gain.
| nowrap | 

|}

Mississippi 

A special election was held in Mississippi on July 17–18, 1837. Its winners were Democrats John F. H. Claiborne and Samuel J. Gholson. The first session of the 25th Congress was a special session beginning on September 4, 1837, extending to October 16. In November, Mississippi, held the regular election. Seargent Smith Prentiss, a Vicksburg lawyer and Whig, unexpectedly launched a vigorous, partisan campaign. He and fellow Whig Thomas J. Word won in an upset. Claiborne and Gholson then argued that the July result entitled them to serve full terms. With the Whig Party newly organizing, the closely divided House, in which Anti-Masons, Nullifiers, and the Independent tended to align more with Whigs and to oppose Democrats, agreed to hear Prentiss. He spoke for nine hours over three days, packing the gallery, drawing Senators, and earning a national reputation for oratory and public admiration from leading Whigs including Senators Clay and Webster. The Elections Committee then required a third election. Scheduled for April 1838, it confirmed the November result. Both Whigs were seated in May late in the second session, also serving for the third session.

|-
! rowspan=2 | (2 seats)
| John F. H. Claiborne
|  | Jacksonian
| 1835
|  | Incumbent lost re-election.New member elected.Whig gain.
| nowrap rowspan=2 | 
|-
| Samuel J. Gholson
|  | Jacksonian
| 1836 (special)
|  | Incumbent lost re-election.New member elected.Whig gain.

|}

Missouri 

|-
! rowspan=2 | 
|
|-
|
|}

New Hampshire 

|-
! rowspan=5 | 
|
|-
|
|-
|
|-
|
|-
|
|}

New Jersey 

|-
! rowspan=6 | 
|
|-
|
|-
|
|-
|
|-
|
|-
|
|}

New York 

|-
! 

|-
! 

|-
! 

|-
! 

|-
! 

|-
! 

|-
! 

|-
! 

|-
! 

|-
! 

|-
! 

|-
! 

|-
! 

|-
! 

|-
! 

|-
! 

|-
! 

|-
! 

|-
! 

|-
! 

|-
! 

|-
! 

|-
! 

|-
! 

|-
! 

|-
! 

|-
! 

|-
! 

|-
! 

|-
! 

|-
! 

|-
! 

|-
! 

|-
! 

|-
! 

|-
! 

|-
! 

|-
! 

|-
! 

|-
! 

|}

North Carolina 

|-
! 

|-
! 

|-
! 

|-
! 

|-
! 

|-
! 

|-
! 

|-
! 

|-
! 

|-
! 

|-
! 

|-
! 

|-
! 

|}

Ohio 

|-
! 

|-
! 

|-
! 

|-
! 

|-
! 

|-
! 

|-
! 

|-
! 

|-
! 

|-
! 

|-
! 

|-
! 

|-
! 

|-
! 

|-
! 

|-
! 

|-
! 

|-
! 

|}

Pennsylvania

Rhode Island 

|-
! rowspan=2 | 
|
|-
|
|}

South Carolina 

|}

|-
! 

|-
! 

|-
! 

|-
! 
| James H. Hammond
|  | Nullifier
| 1834
|  | Incumbent resigned February 26, 1836, because of ill-health.New member elected October 10, 1836.Nullifier hold.Successor also elected the same day to finish the current term.
| nowrap | 

|-
! 

|-
! 

|-
! 

|-
! 

|-
! 

|}

Tennessee 

Elections held late, on August 3, 1837

|-
! 
| William B. Carter
|  | Anti-Jacksonian
| 1835
|  |Incumbent re-elected.Whig gain.
| nowrap | 

|-
! 
| Samuel Bunch
|  | Anti-Jacksonian
| 1833
|  |Incumbent lost re-election.New member elected.Democratic gain.
| nowrap | 

|-
! 
| Luke Lea
|  | Anti-Jacksonian
| 1833
|  |Incumbent retired.New member elected.Whig gain.
| nowrap | 

|-
! 
| James I. Standifer
|  | Anti-Jacksonian
| 1829
|  |Incumbent re-elected.Whig gain.
| nowrap | 

|-
! 
| John B. Forester
|  | Anti-Jacksonian
| 1831
|  |Incumbent retired.New member elected.Democratic gain.
| nowrap | 

|-
! 
| Balie Peyton
|  | Anti-Jacksonian
| 1833
|  |Incumbent retired.New member elected.Whig gain.
| nowrap | 

|-
! 
| John Bell
|  | Anti-Jacksonian
| 1827
|  | Incumbent re-elected.Whig gain.
| nowrap | 

|-
! 
| Abram P. Maury
|  | Anti-Jacksonian
| 1835
|  |Incumbent re-elected.Whig gain.
| nowrap | 

|-
! 
| James K. Polk
|  | Jacksonian
| 1825 
|  |Incumbent re-elected.Democratic gain.
| nowrap | 

|-
! 
| Ebenezer J. Shields
|  | Anti-Jacksonian
| 1835
|  | Incumbent re-elected.Whig gain.
| nowrap | 

|-
! 
| Cave Johnson
|  | Jacksonian
| 1829 
|  |Incumbent lost re-election.New member elected.Whig gain.
| nowrap | 

|-
! 
| Adam Huntsman
|  | Jacksonian
| 1835 
|  | Incumbent retired.New member elected.Whig gain.
| nowrap | 

|-
! 
| William C. Dunlap
|  | Jacksonian
| 1833 
|  |Incumbent lost re-election.New member elected.Whig gain.
| nowrap | 

|}

Vermont 

|-
! 

|-
! 

|-
! 

|-
! 

|-
! 

|}

Virginia 

|-
! 

|-
! 

|-
! 

|-
! 

|-
! 

|-
! 

|-
! 

|-
! 

|-
! 

|-
! 

|-
! 

|-
! 

|-
! 

|-
! 

|-
! 

|-
! 

|-
! 

|-
! 

|-
! 

|-
! 

|-
! 

|}

Wisconsin Territory 
See Non-voting delegates, below.

Non-voting delegates 

|-
! 
| Joseph M. White
|  | Jacksonian
| 1825
|  | Incumbent lost re-election.New delegate elected.Winner was not elected to finish the current term.
| nowrap | 

|-
! 
| colspan=3 | New district
|  | New seat created.New delegate elected in October 1836 and seated December 5, 1836.Jacksonian gain.
| nowrap | 

|}

See also 
 1836 United States elections
 1836 United States presidential election
 1836–37 United States Senate elections
 24th United States Congress
 25th United States Congress
 List of United States House of Representatives elections (1824–1854)

Notes

References

Bibliography

External links 
 Office of the Historian (Office of Art & Archives, Office of the Clerk, U.S. House of Representatives)